Knight of Ellerslie (1881 – 1906) was an American Thoroughbred racehorse. In 1884 he won the Preakness Stakes and was second to Panique in the Belmont Stakes. These two important races would become the second and third legs of the U.S. Triple Crown series.

Knight of Ellerslie was bred at Ellerslie Stud in Albemarle County, Virginia, owned by Richard Hancock. He was the father of Arthur B. Hancock, who would have inherited Ellerslie Stud but who later sold it in order to consolidate his breeding operations at his Claiborne Farm in Paris, Kentucky. Knight of Ellerslie was purchased by Major Thomas Walker Doswell of Bullfield Farm in Doswell, Virginia, who trained and raced him throughout his career on the track.

As a sire, the best of Knight of Ellerslie's progeny was Henry of Navarre, the 1894, and 1895 American Horse of the Year and a future U.S. Racing Hall of Fame inductee.

Knight of Ellerslie died at Woodburn Stud in Kentucky in November 1906.

References

1881 racehorse births
1906 racehorse deaths
Racehorses bred in Virginia
Racehorses trained in the United States
Thoroughbred family 37
Preakness Stakes winners